Akagawa Dam is an asphalt dam located in Tochigi prefecture in Japan. The dam is used for irrigation. The catchment area of the dam is 3.2 km2. The dam impounds about 6  ha of land when full and can store 327 thousand cubic meters of water. The construction of the dam was started on 1965 and completed in 1970.

References

Dams in Tochigi Prefecture
1970 establishments in Japan